Saraimeh (also Romanized as Saraīmeh, Sarāymeh, Sereymeh, Şerīmeh, and Soreymeh; also known as Seraimā and Serīmeh-ye Soflá) is a village in Jarahi Rural District, in the Central District of Mahshahr County, Khuzestan Province, Iran. At the 2006 census, its population was 125, in 25 families.

References 

Populated places in Mahshahr County